Sudan is the geographical region to the south of the Sahara, stretching from Western Africa to Central and Eastern Africa. The name derives from the Arabic , or "the lands of the Blacks", referring to West Africa and northern Central Africa.

Historically, the name was understood to denote the western part of the Sahel region. It thus roughly encompassed the geographical belt between the Sahara and the coastal West Africa.

In modern usage, the term "Sudan" is also used in a separate context to refer specifically to the geographic region comprising the present-day countries of the Sudan, including its western region which forms a part of the country, and South Sudan, which gained its independence in 2011. In order to avoid confusion, the term "the Sudans" has become the preferred option when describing this region.

Geography 

Sudan is marked by hay, forest cliffs and gallery forests along the rivers. Drought and livestock grazing threaten the area with desertification.

The area is predominantly a plateau with river valleys of the Niger, Chad and White Nile.

Sudan is a transition zone between the Sahelian dry desert climate and the dense humid equatorial rainforest. Average annual temperatures vary between 23 and 29 degrees. Temperatures in the coldest months are above 20 degrees Celsius and over 30 degrees Celsius in the hottest months. Daily temperature fluctuations are up to 10-15 degrees. The summer monsoon brings rain from the equator. Precipitation ranges from 100 to 200 mm in the north to 1,500-2,000 mm in the south. During the dry winter season, the hot and dry Harmattan northeasterly wind from the Sahara.

It extends in some 5,000 km in a band several hundred kilometers wide across Africa. It stretches from the border of Senegal, through southern Mali (formerly known as French Sudan when it was a French colony), Burkina Faso, southern Niger, northern Nigeria, northern Ghana, southern Chad, the western Darfur region of present-day Sudan, and South Sudan.

To the north of the region lies the Sahel, a more arid Acacia savanna region that in turn borders the Sahara Desert further north, and to the east the Ethiopian Highlands (called al-Ḥabašah in Arabic). In the southwest lies the West Sudanian savanna, a wetter, tropical savanna region bordering the tropical forests of West Africa. In the center is Lake Chad, and the more fertile region around the lake, while to the south of there are the highlands of Cameroon. To the southeast is the East Sudanian savanna, another tropical savanna region, bordering the forest of Central Africa. This gives way further east to the Sudd, an area of tropical wetland fed by the water of the White Nile.

History 
According to some modern historians, of all the regions of Africa, western Sudan "is the one that has seen the longest development of agriculture, of markets and long-distance trade, and of complex political systems." It is also the first region "south of the Sahara where African Islam took root and flowered."

Middle Ages 
Its medieval history is marked by the caravan trade. The sultanates of eastern Sudan were Darfur, Bagirmi, Sennar and Wadai. In central Sudan, Kanem–Bornu Empire and the Hausa Kingdoms. To the west were Wagadou, Manden, Songhay and the Mossi. Later, the Fula people spread to a wide area. During the colonization period, French Sudan was created and Anglo-Egyptian Sudan was named after the present Sudanese state.

Slave trade 
Early on in the first millennium, many people from the Sudan were used as "a steady steam of slaves for the Mediterranean world" in the Saharan slave trade. With the arrival of the Portuguese in the fifteenth century, "people were directed to the Atlantic slave trade," totaling over a thousand years for the Saharan and four centuries for the Atlantic trades. As a result, slavery critically shaped the institutions and systems of the Sudan. The Portuguese first arrived at Senegambia and found that slavery was "well established" in the region, used to "feed the courts of coastal kings as it was used in the medieval empires of the interior." Between the process of capture, enslavement, and "incorporation into a new community, the slave had neither rights nor any social identity." As a result, the identity of people who were enslaved "came from membership in a corporate group, usually based on kinship."

Modern 
During the period of European colonization, French Sudan was created in the area that would become Mali and Anglo-Egyptian Sudan was formed in what would become the present Sudanese and South Sudanese states.

See also 
 Jews of Bilad el-Sudan
 Sub-Saharan Africa
 Sudanian savanna
 East Sudanian savanna
 West Sudanian savanna

Notes

References 
 Klein, Martin A. (1998). Slavery and Colonial Rule in French West Africa. Cambridge University Press.
 Reader's Digest: Atlas of the World (1991), Rand-McNally, .

Regions of Africa
Tropical and subtropical grasslands, savannas, and shrublands
Ecoregions of Africa
Sub-Saharan Africa
Geography of Burkina Faso
Geography of Chad
Geography of Mali
Geography of Niger
Geography of Nigeria
Geography of Senegal
Geography of South Sudan
Geography of Sudan
Divided regions
Historical regions